Team Stratos is a Spanish motorcycle racing team. The team raced in 2015 FIM CEV Moto2 European Championship season in the Moto2 category with Ariane Racing motorcycles and also competed in the European Superbike Championship with Yamaha motorcycles. In 2016 Team Yamaha Stratos competed in Spanish Roadracing Championship in Stock1000 and Stock 600, also at European FIMCEV Repsol in Moto2, Stock600 and EuropeanTalent Cup.

In 2017 David Checa joined Team Yamaha Stratos in the RFMECEV Spanish Championship.

The Team in RFMECEV is in three categories: Supersport 300, Supersport 600 and Stock100.

References

External links

Motorcycle racing teams
Motorsport in Europe
Motorcycle racing teams established in 2015
2015 establishments in Spain